The 1902 All-Ireland Senior Football Championship was the 16th staging of Ireland's premier Gaelic football knock-out competition. Dublin were the winners.

Format
The four provincial championships are played as usual. The four champions play in the "Home" championship, with the winners of the Home final going on to face  in the All-Ireland final.

Results

Connacht Senior Football Championship
 were the only entrants, so they got a bye to the Home semi-final.

Leinster Senior Football Championship

The match was unfinished and a replay ordered.

The match was unfinished and a replay ordered.

Munster Senior Football Championship

Ulster Senior Football Championship

All-Ireland Senior Football Championship

Championship statistics

Miscellaneous

 Dublin win another two-in-a-row as All Ireland Champions.

References